There's a Fire Burning (Swedish: Det brinner en eld) is a 1943 Swedish  drama film directed by Gustaf Molander and starring Inga Tidblad, Lars Hanson and Victor Sjöström.  It was made at the Råsunda Studios in Stockholm. The film's sets were designed by the art director Arne Åkermark. Location shooting took place in Jämtland County. It was set in a thinly-disguised version of German-occupied Norway. This was part of a wider wartime strategy of setting films in unnamed countries adopted by the film industry in neutral Sweden. Molander directed a further film on a similar topic The Invisible Wall the following year.

Synopsis
A diplomat from a foreign country is in a relationship with the leading actress of the national theatre and is well liked by other members of the company. However, this all changes when his country invades and occupies their nation.

Cast

 Inga Tidblad as 	Harriet Brandt
 Lars Hanson as 	Ernst Lemmering
 Victor Sjöström as 	Henrik Falkman
 Gerd Hagman as 	Eva Brenner
 Lauritz Falk as 	Lauritz Bernt
 Tollie Zellman as 	Lisa Albert
 Hampe Faustman as Georg Brandt 
 Stig Järrel as Paul Winter
 Hugo Björne as 	Gen. Wollert
 Georg Funkquist as 	Bruhn
 Gabriel Alw as 	Government Minister
 Agda Helin as 	Frida 
 Erik Hell as 	Jodl 
 Mona Geijer-Falkner as 	Anna 
 Ivar Kåge as 	Col. Barck 
 Carl Ström as 	Col. Lanner 
 Olav Riégo as 	Arnold 
 Artur Rolén as 	Oskar - Stage Manager 
 Karin Alexandersson as 	Old Woman 
 Ernst Brunman as 	Actor 
 Nils Dahlgren as Soldier 
 Edvard Danielsson as 	Man 
 Eivor Engelbrektsson as 	Actress 
 John Ericsson as 	Man 
 Olle Florin as Officer 
 Glann Gustafsson as 	Actress 
 Marianne Gyllenhammar as 	Young Woman 
 Sten Hedlund as Aide 
 Torsten Hillberg as 	Captain 
 Magnus Kesster as 	Actor 
 Marianne Lenard as	Actress 
 Richard Lund as Actor 
 Wilma Malmlöf as 	Prompter 
 Segol Mann as 	Soldier
 Helge Mauritz as 	Officer 
 Kerstin Moheden as 	Woman 
 Theodor Olsson as 	Man 
 Barbro Ribbing as 	Woman 
 Erik Rosén as 	Secretary of Legation 
 Curt Sivers as 	Man 
 Majken Torkeli as 	Actress 
 Hugo Tranberg as 	Soldier 
 Britta Vieweg as 	Woman 
 Eric von Gegerfelt as 	Actor

References

Bibliography 
 Iverson, Gunnar, Soderbergh Widding, Astrid & Soila, Tytti. Nordic National Cinemas. Routledge, 2005.
 Qvist, Per Olov & von Bagh, Peter. Guide to the Cinema of Sweden and Finland. Greenwood Publishing Group, 2000.
 Wright, Rochelle. The Visible Wall: Jews and Other Ethnic Outsiders in Swedish Film. SIU Press, 1998.

External links 
 

1943 films
1943 drama films
Swedish drama films
1940s Swedish-language films
Films directed by Gustaf Molander
Swedish black-and-white films
1940s Swedish films